The Rambagh Palace in Jaipur, Rajasthan is the former residence of the Maharaja of Jaipur located  outside the walls of the city of Jaipur on Bhawani Singh road.

History
The first building on the site was a garden house built in 1835 for the wet nurse of prince Ram Singh II. In 1887, during the reign of Maharaja Thakur Sawai Madho Singh, it was converted into a modest royal hunting lodge, as the house was located in the midst of a thick forest at that time. In the early 20th century, it was expanded into a palace to the designs of Sir Samuel Swinton Jacob. Maharajah Sawai Man Singh II made Rambagh his principal residence and added a number of royal suites in 1931. 

It is now operated as a five-star hotel by the Taj Hotels Group. Anderson Cooper stayed at the Rambagh Palace  in 2009.

See also  
 City Palace, Jaipur 
 Raj Mahal 
 Jai Mahal

References

References

External links

 

Heritage hotels in India
Hotels in Jaipur
Palaces in Jaipur
Royal residences in India
Samuel Swinton Jacob buildings
Taj Hotels Resorts and Palaces
Rajput architecture